Feluda: 50 Years of Ray's Detective is a Bengali documentary film directed and produced by Sagnik Chatterjee based on a fictional detective character created by Satyajit Ray This is the first biopic of India based on a fictional character. At first the film was premiered at the New York Indian Film Festival in 2017 and finally released on 7 June 2019. It received the award for Best Director in Non-Feature Film at the 66th National Film Awards in 2019.<ref>{{Cite web|url=https://www.outlookindia.com/newsscroll/feluda-docufilm-maker-dedicates-national-award-to-sleuths-fans/1593972|title=Feluda docu-film maker dedicates National Award to sleuths fans|website=Outlook (India)|access-date=2020-01-05}}</ref>

Synopsis
Feluda was created by Satyajit Ray. Felu alias Pradosh Chandra Mitter'' is one of the most popular fictional detective in India turns 50 in the year of 2017. The documentary contains literary references of Feluda films, interviews of onscreen Feluda and other characters. It also contains the history and chronology of the character and its creator Ray, rare audio clips, illustrations etc.

Cast
 Soumitra Chatterjee
 Sandip Ray
 Sabyasachi Chakraborty
 Paran Bandopadhyay
 Saswata Chatterjee
 Abir Chatterjee
 Kushal Chakraborty
 Ritwick Chakraborty

References

2017 films
Bengali-language Indian films
Indian biographical films
2017 documentary films
Indian documentary films
Feluda (series)